Cameron Wright (born 15 September 1968) is  a former Australian rules footballer who played with Footscray in the Victorian Football League (VFL).

Notes

External links 
		

Living people
1968 births
Australian rules footballers from Victoria (Australia)
Western Bulldogs players
West Footscray Football Club players